Douglas-Daly may refer to:

Douglas-Daly, Northern Territory, Australia, a locality
Douglas-Daly Experiment Station, a research station in the Northern Territory
Douglas Daly School, a school in the Northern Territory

See also
 Daly (disambiguation)
 Douglas (disambiguation)